Dennis D. Pyle (born February 4, 1961) is an independent member of the Kansas Senate, representing the 1st district since 2005. He ran for governor of Kansas in the 2022 election.

Legislative career
Pyle was a member of the Kansas House of Representatives for the 49th district from 2001 to 2003. He lost a race for reelection to Republican Scott Schwab, who later became the Kansas Secretary of State, but was elected to his Kansas Senate seat in 2004. In 2020, he won his third reelection to his first district position in northeast Kansas with over 70% of the vote.

Committee assignments
Pyle served on these legislative committees: but was removed by Senate President Ty Masterson from some of those assignments during the 2022 legislative session when he refused to vote for the Kansas Republican Party's congressional redistricting map.

 Agriculture
 Assessment and Taxation
 Children's Issues
 Special Claims Against the State
 State-Tribal Relations
 Utilities

Sponsored legislation
Pyle's sponsored bills have included:
 A bill promoting trade between Kansas and Taiwan.
 A bill regarding income tax credit for some property taxes.

Major donors
The top contributors to Pyle's 2008 campaign, according to OpenSecrets were the Kansas Republican Senatorial Committee, State of Kansas Department of Administration, Kansas Medical Society, Brown County Republican Central Committee, Kansas Republican Senatorial Committee Party.

Congressional campaigns
He received 43% of the vote. He ran again for the seat in a crowded field in 2018, as Jenkins was retiring, but the race was won by self-financed, one-term Republican Steve Watkins.

Ethics complaint
On June 5, 2010, it was made public that a formal ethics complaint had been filed against Pyle, "alleging improper expenditures from his Senate campaign account on a trip to Washington, D.C., to evaluate support for his challenge of U.S. Rep. Lynn Jenkins." The complaint specifically alleged "Pyle violated state campaign finance laws by using money raised for a state campaign for activities related to possible federal campaign." On June 28, 2010, Pyle was cleared of any wrongdoing.

2022 gubernatorial campaign

On June 7, 2022, Pyle announced his plan to pursue a campaign for the office of Governor of Kansas because he said, "I am a God-loving American, devoted to the Constitution and protecting our children, and I am entering this race to give Kansans a choice". To reach the ballot requires 5,000 signatures as verified by the three-member Kansas Objections Board. The Board includes the Kansas Secretary of State, Republican Scott Schwab and Attorney General and Republican gubernatorial candidate Derek Schmidt, along with the governor's General Counsel. The situation with Board's potential conflicts has been scrutinized for some time, in particular by former State Senator Anthony Hensley. In August, Pyle turned in almost 9,000 signatures for review. 

C.J. Grover, the campaign manager for Republican Kansas Attorney General Derek Schmidt, labeled Pyle as a "fake conservative" "who just wants attention." "He stood with pro-abortion legislators to nearly derail the 'Value Them Both' amendment," adding, "...he sided with (Governor) Laura Kelly, Hillary Clinton's lawyers and the ACLU against our Republican majority in the Legislature on redistricting maps." "Now, he's trying to help Laura Kelly and Joe Biden again with a vanity run for governor." Kansas Republican Party Executive Director Shannon Pahls said Pyle is "knowingly providing Laura Kelly the only path to a second term." Pyle in turn described Schmidt and Kelly as "two peas in a pod." The Republican party launched an effort to get signers of Pyle's ballot inclusion petition to withdraw their signatures. On August 25, 2022, the Kansas Secretary of State announced that he collected enough valid signatures to be placed on the ballot.

Personal life
Pyle attended Hiawatha High School and Grace College of the Bible. He is married to Jennifer Pyle, and they farm in Hiawatha. They have six daughters.

References

External links
Pyle for Kansas campaign website
Senator Dennis Pyle legislative website 

|-

1961 births
21st-century American politicians
Grace University alumni
Kansas Independents
Kansas Republicans
Kansas state senators
Living people
Members of the Kansas House of Representatives
People from Hiawatha, Kansas